The  SIGCHI Bulletin  is one of the two membership publications of ACM SIGCHI, the Special Interest Group on Computer Human Interaction. The other publication is ACM interactions.

The Bulletin was first published in July 1982, though bearing the volume number 14, since it was a result of the renaming of the SIGSOC Bulletin, after SIGSOC (Special Interest Group on Social and Behavioral Computing) renamed itself to SIGCHI. It was published quarterly until 1999 when it became bi-monthly, but returned to quarterly in 2005.

The Bulletin was a paper publication until October 1995, after which it was published simultaneously on paper and on the Web, until July 2003, when it became online-only.

In 2000, SIGCHI made interactions its member publication. Up until then members had had to subscribe to it separately. From that point, the Bulletin was published as a supplement to interactions.

Editors
 Jul 1982 - Apr 85) Ann Janda 
 Jul 1985 Lorraine Borman (acting) 
 Oct 1985 - Jul 90 Peter Orbeton 
 Oct 1990 - Oct 93 Bill Hefley
 Jan 1994 - Oct 1998 Steven Pemberton
 Jan 1999 - Jul 1999 Ayman Mukerji
 Oct 1999 -  2003 Joseph A. Konstan
 Jul 2003 - Nov 2004 Jonathan Arnowitz
 Jan 2005 - 2007 Brian Bailey
 2008 - Mark Apperley

External links 
 ACM
 SIGCHI
 SIGCHI Bulletin
 interactions
 History of SIGCHI to 1996 includes interviews with past editors.

Association for Computing Machinery magazines